is a railway station on the Chitose Line in Shiroishi-ku, Sapporo, Hokkaido, Japan, operated by Hokkaido Railway Company (JR Hokkaido). The station is numbered "H04".

Lines
Heiwa Station is served by Chitose Line.

The tracks of the Hakodate Main Line pass around this station, but the station does not serve them.

Station layout
The station consists of an island platform serving two tracks. The station has automated ticket machines, automated turnstiles which accept Kitaca, and a "Midori no Madoguchi" staffed ticket office.

Platforms

Surroundings
 , (to Asahikawa)
 , (to Shibecha)
 Kawashimo Park
 JR Freight Sapporo Freight Terminal
 Kita-Shiraishi Police Station
 Kita-Shiraishi Ni-jo Post Office
 Hokkaido "No more exposure to radiation" Hall, (with Hiroshima & Nagasaki Atomic Bomb Exhibition).
 Sapporo Warehouse complex
 Sapporo Shinkin Bank, Kita branch

See also
 List of railway stations in Japan

References

External links
 Heiwa JR Hokkaido map

Railway stations in Japan opened in 1986
Railway stations in Sapporo